The Lewis Range is a mountain range located in the Rocky Mountains of northern Montana, United States and extreme southern Alberta, Canada. It was formed as a result of the Lewis Overthrust, a geologic thrust fault resulted in the overlying of younger Cretaceous rocks by older Proterozoic rocks. The range is located within Waterton Lakes National Park in Alberta, Canada and Glacier National Park and the Bob Marshall Wilderness Complex in Montana, United States.

Geology
In this relatively rare occurrence, older rocks are now positioned above newer ones.

Geography
The Lewis Range is within Waterton Lakes National Park in Canada, and in Glacier National Park and the Bob Marshall Wilderness Complex located in Flathead and Lewis and Clark National Forests in Montana. The Continental Divide spans much of the uppermost sections of the range. Major peaks in the range include Mount Cleveland (10,466 ft/3,185 m), which is the highest peak in the range and in Glacier National Park. Other prominent peaks include Mount Stimson (10,142 ft/3,091 m), Mount Jackson (10,052 ft/3,064 m), Mount Siyeh (10,014 ft/3,052 m), Going to the Sun Mountain, (9,642 ft/2,939 m) and the isolated Chief Mountain (9,080 ft/2,768 m). Major passes include Marias Pass and Logan Pass which bisects Glacier National Park east to west.

See also
 Mountains and mountain ranges of Glacier National Park (U.S.)
 List of mountain ranges in Montana

External links
 

 
Mountain ranges of Alberta
Mountain ranges of Montana
Landforms of Flathead County, Montana
Landforms of Glacier County, Montana
Glacier National Park (U.S.)
Mountains of Glacier National Park (U.S.)